Udodi Chudi Onwuzurike (born 29 January 2003) is a Nigerian sprinter who specializes in the 200 metres. He was the gold medallist at the World Athletics U20 Championships in 2021.

References

External links 
 Stanford Cardinal bio
 

2003 births
Living people
Nigerian male sprinters
World Athletics U20 Championships winners
Stanford Cardinal men's track and field athletes
21st-century Nigerian people
Athletes (track and field) at the 2022 Commonwealth Games
Commonwealth Games bronze medallists for Kenya
Commonwealth Games medallists in athletics
Medallists at the 2022 Commonwealth Games